The women's 100 metres sprint event at the 1972 Olympic Games took place on September 1 & 2.

Results

Heats

Top five in each heat (blue) and the next two fastest (pink) advanced to quarterfinal round.

Heat 1

Heat 2

Heat 3

Heat 4

Heat 5

Heat 6

Quarterfinals
Top four in each heat advanced to semifinal round (blue).

Quarterfinal 1

Quarterfinal  2

Quarterfinal 3

Quarterfinal 4

Semifinals
Top four in each heat advanced to the final round (blue).

Semifinal 1

Semifinal 2

Final

Key:  WR = world record; DNS = did not start; T = Tie

References

External links
Official report

Women's 100 metres
1972 in women's athletics
Women's events at the 1972 Summer Olympics